João Batista Lima Gomes (born 24 June 1985 in Sao Paulo, Brazil, popularly known as Lima, also nicknamed Mossoró in his native Brazil, is a Brazilian professional football player who played for Wofoo Tai Po FC. in the 2010-11 Hong Kong First Division League.

Career

Tai Po FC
Lima's signing was confirmed on 22 August 2011 and he will travel with the team to Thailand for pre-season training. On 11 September 2011, Lima made his debut and scored in a 3:0 win over Hong Kong Sapling.

References

External links

João Batista Lima Gomes at HKFA

Brazilian footballers
Tai Po FC players
Living people
1985 births
Footballers from São Paulo
Brazilian expatriate footballers
Expatriate footballers in Saudi Arabia
Expatriate footballers in Hong Kong
Brazilian expatriate sportspeople in Saudi Arabia
Brazilian expatriate sportspeople in Hong Kong
Association football forwards